Phahonphonphayuhasena is a Thai noble title, granted to high-ranking military officers.

People who held the title include:
Phraya Phahonphonphayuhasena (Kim), held the title with the rank phra from 1885 to 1895, and phraya from 1895
Phraya Phahonphonphayuhasena (Arun Chatrakul), held the title from 1900 to 1903, later became Chaophraya Bodindechanuchit
, held the title from 1903 to 1913
Phraya Phahonphonphayuhasena (Phot Phahonyothin), held the title from 1931

References

Thai titles of nobility